The Grob G109 is a light aircraft developed by Grob Aircraft AG of Mindelheim Mattsies in Germany. It first flew (G109 prototype and then production G109A form) in 1980. The G109B followed in 1984. It is a two-seat self-launching motor glider in which the pilot and passenger or student sit side by side, with good visibility provided by large windows. 

As well as normal civilian use this aircraft was also used in the Royal Air Force Volunteer Gliding Squadrons (VGS) to train air cadets through the gliding induction and gliding scholarship courses up until 5 May 2018, when it was retired from service. The Grob 109B was known in RAF service as the Vigilant T1. The G 109 was the first motor glider built using composite construction to be granted Federal Aviation Administration approval.

Design and development

Technical description (G 109B / Vigilant T1)
The G109B was developed after series production of the G109A which itself followed a number of early prototypes with differing wing spans, configurations etc. The G109B addressed several issues learnt from operation of the earlier G109A which included improvements to power (95Hp up from 80Hp on the G109A), performance of the wings when wet, crosswind behaviour and limits and cockpit space.

The G109B aircraft is a low-wing cantilever motor glider, with a T-tail, folding (and detachable) wings, and side-by-side seating with dual controls. It is mainly constructed from glass-reinforced plastic and has a taildragger undercarriage arrangement. Entry and exit from the cockpit is via two perspex doors which open upwards individually – a modification from the original one-piece G109A canopy. The cockpit can be heated, providing that the engine is running, and the seat backs can be adjusted and cushions of differing thickness inserted to accommodate a range of body sizes.

The RAF sought and obtained a number of military specific modifications; including a dispensation from Grob for operating the military variant aircraft to a Max AUW of 908 kg providing an extra 59 kg of useful load. The aircraft was not modified to allow this and no changes to the operating procedures were required as the centre of gravity constraints were not exceeded. Grob have applied to EASA for permission to have an exception to the design standard (CS22) for the Grob 109B which would allow it to be certified to a similar 903 kg Max AUW however while the two objections received were rejected by EASA the authority has not yet taken the necessary rulemaking action to allow this. 
The engine (based on a Porsche air-cooled car unit) can be shut down in flight with its propeller blades feathered. The aircraft then becomes a pure glider, with a best glide ratio of around 1:28. The Porsche-derived horizontally opposed air-cooled engine had the cylinder bore increase by Grob to make the engine 2.5-litre capacity and has had its Time Before Overhaul (TBO) increased by a technote to 1,600 hours after many examples run on condition reached up to or in excess of 4,000 hours in service.

Under the current CAA LASORS document, the G109B can be classed as either a touring motor glider (TMG), or a self-launching motor glider (SLMG).

Engine
The propeller is a two-bladed, manually operated variable-pitch type driven directly from the engine. Three pitch settings can be used: Fine for take-off and general flying, Coarse for cruising, and Feathered for gliding with the engine off.

Carburettor heat can be supplied to the twin carburettors when there is a risk of icing. An electric fuel pump is used.

Controls
The G 109 uses conventional controls, duplicated for both seats, including the throttle (not available on the left in standard production G 109s). The rudder pedals, which also operate the wheel brakes, are adjustable forward and backward to suit individuals of differing leg length, and airbrakes are used to increase the rate of descent during the landing approach as well as limiting airspeed to Vne (velocity never exceed), if required.

Operational history (Vigilant T1)

The Vigilant T1 variant was introduced into service in 1991, replacing the Slingsby Venture, and was used by Volunteer Gliding Squadrons (VGS) around the UK to train Air Training Corps and Combined Cadet Force cadets in basic flying with the aim of bringing them to a standard where they are able to fly solo. The initial order for 53 was topped up by aircraft bought in the private market. The Vigilant was also used by the Royal Air Force Central Gliding School, at RAF Syerston in Nottinghamshire, which trains VGS instructors as well as providing standards checking, syllabus development and engineering support.

During the early 2000s Australian Air Force Cadets adopted the Grob109 for pilot training purposes. The type is still in use to date.

The RAF Vigilant fleet was 'paused' from flying since April 2014 due to ongoing maintenance issues associated with airworthiness certification. A recovery plan was put into in operation in 2016 which saw Vigilant numbers reduced to 15 nationwide, flown by four VGSs at 'regional hubs'.  It was anticipated that these relaunched gliders would be disposed of in October 2019. This date was brought forward and the Vigilant was retired from service on 5 May 2018.

On Tuesday 3 March 2020, the UK disabled flying Charity Aerobility announced that it had acquired the RAF Vigilant T1 hulls and would re-engine some with Rotax 912is3 engines and retrofit the latest Garmin glass cockpits. The new aircraft will be known as the Grob 109 Able.

Variants

G 109
The first two prototype aircraft (constructor's serial numbers 6001 and 6010) were designated G 109. The first prototype, (registered D-KBGF), flew for the first time on 14 March 1980.

G 109A
 
The spare engine power available was marginal in hot atmospheric conditions or when flying through rain, so around 30 G 109A airframes were fitted with a 2,400 cc  Limbach engine and an electrically controlled variable-pitch propeller. At least two aircraft have been approved to use the Rotax 912 engine. See G 109Ar.

A total of 151 G 109A motor gliders were produced.

G 109Ar

The G 109Ar was a modification used on 2 Grob109A by the Aero Club Valkenburg of two aircraft with a Rotax boxer-type engine for increased performance on short runways and reliability. The nose of the plane is longer than that of the regular G 109A, the engine covers are shaped differently to house the engine and its air inlets and improve airflow across the larger radiator. 3 Grob109A's were converted on the G109Ar. The Aero Club Valkenburg still has 2 of these, the ph-710 and ph-835.

G 109B

Some aircraft in Germany have been fitted with a turbocharged engine, and with structural strengthening of the fuselage have been adapted to aero-tow gliders.

RangerIncreased MTOW utility version with cameras in extended leading edge root fairings and provision for a ventral pannier for search and rescue equipment.

Vigilant T1
The Vigilant T1 is the designation of the adapted Grob 109B used by the Royal Air Force (RAF) for use on Volunteer Gliding Squadrons. Modifications to the Vigilant T1 include a landing light, a higher maximum all up mass (AUM) of 908 kg and a throttle for use in the left hand seat.

G 109 Able
The Vigilant T1 with Rotax 912is3 engine by charity Aerobility

Operators

 (Current as of 2014)
 ADF - Australian Air Force Cadets
 (Former)

Royal Air Force
 No. 2 Flying Training School RAF

Specifications (G 109B)

See also

References

Notes

Bibliography

 Hardy, Michael. Gliders and Sailplanes of the World. London: Ian Allan, 1982.  .
 Grob 109B on the Grob website

External links

Homepage of Grob Aircraft
Air Cadet Organisation - Gliding Courses
ACV Aero Club Valkenburg - flight club

Grob aircraft
1980s German sport aircraft
Single-engined tractor aircraft
Low-wing aircraft
Motor gliders
T-tail aircraft
Aircraft first flown in 1980
Aircraft first flown in 1989